Postal codes used in the United Kingdom, British Overseas Territories and Crown dependencies are known as postcodes (originally, postal codes). They are alphanumeric and were adopted nationally between 11 October 1959 and 1974, having been devised by the General Post Office (Royal Mail). A full postcode is known as a "postcode unit" and designates an area with several addresses or a single major delivery point.

The structure of a postcode is two alphanumeric codes that show, first, the Post Town and, second, a small group of addresses in that post town. The first alphanumeric code (the Outward code or Outcode) has between two and four characters and the second (the Inward Code or Incode) always has three characters. The Outcode indicates the postcode area and postcode district.  It consists of one or two letters, followed by one digit, two digits, or one digit and one letter. This is followed by a space and then the Incode which indicates the postcode sector and delivery point (usually a group of around 15 addresses).   The incode always has 3 characters, starting with a number (denoting a sector within the district), and ending with two letters (denoting delivery points which are allocated to streets, sides of a street or individual properties). Postcode areas are usually, but not always, named after a major town or city — such as B for Birmingham.  A small number are geographic in nature — such as HS for the Outer Hebrides and FY for Fylde (the region around Blackpool).

Each postcode area contains a number of post towns which are not themselves alphabetically denoted; however each will generally constitute one or more postcode districts. Example: a sizeable part of southern England is covered by the GU postcode area, named after the town of Guildford. Guildford itself consists of postal districts GU1 and GU2. Nearby Woking, a major commuter town— away—is a post town within the postal district GU22. The central part of the town/city the postcode area is named after will have the number 1 e.g. B1 (Birmingham), LS1 (Leeds), M1 (Manchester). However, other post towns within the area are then either treated alphabetically—particularly in London—e.g. Chingford on the north-eastern edge of London being E4, whereas adjacent Walthamstow to the south being E17–or geographically— e.g. the Outer Hebrides area HS numbering the districts north to south.

As a general rule, large post towns are numbered from the centre outward such that outlying parts have higher numbered districts.  However, the disparate post towns within a postal area can be numbered based on various criteria.  The town the postal area is named after excepted, this normally being 1. In particular, the centrality of a postcode district within a postcode area cannot be reliably inferred from the postcode alone.  For instance, SE1 covers a large part of Central London south of the Thames whereas SE2 covers Abbey Wood at the far end of the Elizabeth Line. See postcode area.

Postcodes have been adopted for a wide range of purposes in addition to aiding the sorting of mail: for calculating insurance premiums, designating destinations in route planning software and as the lowest level of aggregation in census enumeration. The boundaries of each postcode unit and within these the full address data of currently about 29 million addresses (delivery points) are stored, maintained and periodically updated in the Postcode Address File database.

The initial system of named postal districts, developed in London and other large cities from 1857, evolved towards the present form: in 1917 London was split into broad numbered subdivisions, and this extended to the other cities in 1934.

Theoretically, deliveries can reach their destination using the house number (or name if the house has no number) and postcode alone; however, this is against Royal Mail guidelines, which request the use of a full address.

History

Earlier postal districts

London

The London post town covers 40% of Greater London. On inception (in 1857/8), it was divided into ten postal districts: EC (East Central), WC (West Central), N, NE, E, SE, S, SW, W, and NW. The S and NE sectors were later abolished. In 1917, as a wartime measure to improve efficiency, each postal district was subdivided into sub-districts each identified by a number; the area served directly by the district head office was allocated the number 1; the other numbers were allocated alphabetically by delivery office, e.g. N2 East Finchley delivery office, N3 Finchley delivery office, N4 Finsbury Park delivery office etc. Since then these sub-districts have changed little.

Some older road signs in Hackney still show the North East (NE) sector/district.

Other large cities and towns

Following the successful introduction of postal districts in London, the system was extended to other large towns and cities. Liverpool was divided into Eastern, Northern, Southern and Western districts in 1864/65, and Manchester and Salford into eight numbered districts in 1867/68.

In 1917, Dublin—then still part of the United Kingdom—was divided into numbered postal districts. These continue in use in a modified form by An Post, the postal service of the Republic of Ireland. In 1923, Glasgow was divided in a similar way to London, with numbered districts preceded by a letter denoting the compass point (C, W, NW, N, E, S, SW, SE).

In January 1932 the Postmaster General approved the designation of some predominantly urban areas into numbered districts. In November 1934 the Post Office announced the introduction of numbered districts (short postal codes) in "every provincial town in the United Kingdom large enough to justify it". Pamphlets were issued to each householder and business in ten areas notifying them of the number of the district in which their premises lay. The pamphlets included a map of the districts, and copies were made available at local head post offices. The public were "particularly invited" to include the district number in the address at the head of letters.

A publicity campaign in the following year encouraged the use of the district numbers. The slogan for the campaign was "For speed and certainty always use a postal district number on your letters and notepaper". A poster was fixed to every pillar box in the affected areas bearing the number of the district and appealing for the public's co-operation. Every post office in the numbered district was also to display this information. Printers of Christmas cards and stationery were requested to always include district numbers in addresses, and election agents for candidates in the upcoming general election were asked to ensure they correctly addressed the 100 million items of mail they were expected to post. Businesses were issued with a free booklet containing maps and listings of the correct district number for every street in the ten areas.

The ten areas were:
Birmingham
Brighton/Hove
Bristol
Edinburgh
Glasgow
Leeds/Bradford
Liverpool
Manchester/Salford
Newcastle upon Tyne
Sheffield

For example, Toxteth was Liverpool 8. A single numbering sequence was shared by Manchester and Salford: letters would be addressed to Manchester 1 or Salford 7 (lowest digits, respectively). Some Birmingham codes were sub-divided with a letter, such as Great Barr, Birmingham 22 or Birmingham 22a, as can still be seen on many older street-name signs.

Modern postcode system
The Post Office experimented with electromechanical sorting machines in the late 1950s. These devices presented an envelope to an operator, who would press a button indicating which bin to sort the letter into. Postcodes were suggested to increase the efficiency of this process by removing the need for the sorter to remember the correct sorting for as many places. In January 1959 the Post Office analysed the results of a survey on public attitudes towards the use of postal codes, choosing a town in which to experiment with codes. The envisaged format was a six-character alphanumeric code with three letters designating the geographical area and three numbers to identify the individual address. On 28 July Ernest Marples, the Postmaster General, announced that Norwich had been selected, and that each of the 150,000 private and business addresses would receive a code by October. Norwich had been selected as it already had eight automatic mail sorting machines in use. The original Norwich format consisted of "NOR," followed by a space, then a two-digit number (which, unlike the current format, could include a leading zero), and finally a single letter (instead of the two final letters in the current format).

In October 1965, Tony Benn as Postmaster General announced that postal coding was to be extended to the rest of the country in the next few years.

On 1 May 1967 postcodes were introduced in Croydon. The many postcodes for central Croydon began with "CRO", while those of the surrounding post towns with CR2, CR3 and CR4. The uniform system of a set of three final characters after the space (such as 0AA, known as the inward code) was adopted. This was to be the beginning of a ten-year plan, costing an estimated £24 million. Within two years it was expected that full coding would be used in Aberdeen, Belfast, Brighton, Bristol, Bromley, Cardiff, Coventry, Manchester, Newcastle upon Tyne, Newport, Reading, Sheffield, Southampton and the Western district of London. By 1967, codes had been introduced to Aberdeen, Southampton, Brighton and Derby. In 1970, codes were introduced to the London Western and North Western postal districts. In December 1970, much Christmas mail was postmarked with the message "Remember to use the Postal Code" although codes were used to sort mail in only a handful of sorting offices.

During 1971, occupants of addresses began to receive notification of their postcode. Asked in the House of Commons about the completion of the coding exercise, the Minister of State for Posts and Telecommunications (whose role superseded that of Postmaster General in 1969), Sir John Eden, stated that it was expected to be completed during 1972. The scheme was finalised in 1974 when Norwich was completely re-coded but the scheme tested in Croydon was sufficiently close to the final design for it to be retained, with CRO standardised as CR0 (district zero) thus removing the need to create a CR1 district.

A quirk remained: the central Newport (Gwent) area was allocated NPT at a similar time to Croydon becoming CRO, and surrounding areas were (as today) allocated NP1–NP8. NPT lasted until the end of 1984 when it was recoded NP9.

Girobank's GIR 0AA was the last domestic postcode with a fully alphabetical outward code. That code no longer exists in the Royal Mail's PAF system, but was taken over by the bank's current owners, Santander UK.

Adaptation of earlier systems into national system
When the national postcode system was introduced, many existing postal districts were incorporated into it, so that postcodes in Toxteth (Liverpool 8) start with L8. The districts in both Manchester and Salford gained M postcodes, so Salford 7 became M7 and so on (and similarly in Brighton and Hove, both using the prefix BN). The old coding lives on in a small number of street signs with (for example) "Salford 7" at the bottom. In other cases, the district numbers were replaced with unrelated numbers. In Glasgow many of its G-prefixed numbers are not used as C1 became G1, W1 became G11, N1 became G21, E1 became G31, S1 became G41, SW1 became G51, and so on. In London (as postally defined), 1917-created postal districts are mapped unchanged to those of today but its much enlarged administrative area, Greater London, was created in April 1965. From that month the remaining 60% of Greater London's area has postcodes referring to 13 other post towns. Additionally, there were too few postcodes to adequately cover districts in central London (particularly in the WC and EC areas), so these were subdivided with a letter suffix rather than being split into new numbered districts so as to retain the familiar codes.

GB postcodes available as OpenData
Prior to 1 April 2010, the Royal Mail licensed use of the postcode database for a charge of about £4,000 per year. Following a campaign and a government consultation in 2009, the Ordnance Survey released Code-Point Open, detailing each current postcode in Great Britain together with a geo-code for re-use free of charge under an attribution-only licence (Open Government Licence as part of OS OpenData).

Postcodes linked to a variety of UK geographies 
The Office for National Statistics (ONS Geography) maintains and publishes a series of freely available, downloadable postcode products that link all current and terminated UK postcodes to a range of administrative, health, statistical and other geographies using the Code-Point Open grid reference.

Formatting

Overview
The postcodes are alphanumeric, and are variable in length: ranging from six to eight characters (including a space). Each postcode is divided into two parts separated by a single space: the outward code and the inward code respectively. The outward code includes the postcode area and the postcode district, respectively. The inward code includes the postcode sector and the postcode unit respectively. Examples of postcodes are "SW1W 0NY", "PO16 7GZ", "GU16 7HF", and "L1 8JQ".

Outward code
The outward code is the part of the postcode before the single space in the middle. It is between two and four characters long. Examples of outward codes are "L1", "W1A", "RH1", "RH10" or "SE1P". A few outward codes are non-geographic, not divulging where mail is to be sent.

Postcode area
The postcode area is part of the outward code. The postcode area is either one or two characters long and is alphabetical, with there being 121 such areas. Examples of postcode areas are "L" for Liverpool, "RH" for Redhill and "EH" for Edinburgh. A postal area may cover a wide area, for example "RH" covers various settlements in eastern Surrey and northern Sussex, and "BT" (Belfast) covers the whole of Northern Ireland.

Postcode district
The postcode district is one digit, two digits or a digit followed by a letter.

Inward code
The inward code is the part of the postcode after the single space in the middle. It is three characters long. The inward code assists in the delivery of post within a postal district. Examples of inward codes are "0NY", "7GZ", "7HF", or "8JQ".

Postcode sector
The postcode sector is made up of a single digit (the first character of the inward code).

Postcode unit
The postcode unit is two characters added to the end of the postcode sector. A postcode unit generally represents a street, part of a street, a single address, a group of properties, a single property, a sub-section of the property, an individual organisation or (for instance Driver and Vehicle Licensing Agency) a subsection of the organisation. The level of discrimination is often based on the amount of mail received by the premises or business.

Validation
The format is as follows, where A signifies a letter and 9 a digit:

Notes:
 As all formats end with 9AA, the first part of a postcode can easily be extracted by ignoring the last three characters.
 Areas with only single-digit districts: BR, FY, HA, HD, HG, HR, HS, HX, JE, LD, SM, SR, WC, WN, ZE (although WC is always subdivided by a further letter, e.g. WC1A)
 Areas with only double-digit districts: AB, LL, SO
 Areas with a district '0' (zero): BL, BS, CM, CR, FY, HA, PR, SL, SS (BS is the only area to have both a district 0 and a district 10)
 The following central London single-digit districts have been further divided by inserting a letter after the digit and before the space: EC1–EC4 (but not EC50), SW1, W1, WC1, WC2 and parts of E1 (E1W), N1 (N1C and N1P), NW1 (NW1W) and SE1 (SE1P).
 The letters Q, V and X are not used in the first position.
 The letters I, J and Z are not used in the second position.
 The only letters to appear in the third position are A, B, C, D, E, F, G, H, J, K, P, S, T, U and W when the structure starts with A9A.
 The only letters to appear in the fourth position are A, B, E, H, M, N, P, R, V, W, X and Y when the structure starts with AA9A.
 The final two letters do not use C, I, K, M, O or V, so as not to resemble digits or each other when hand-written.
 Postcode sectors are one of ten digits: 0 to 9, with 0 only used once 9 has been used in a post town, save for Croydon and Newport (see above).

A postcode can be validated against a table of all 1.7 million postcodes in Code-Point Open. The full delivery address including postcode can be validated against the Royal Mail Postcode Address File (PAF), which lists 29 million valid delivery addresses, constituting most (but not all) addresses in the UK.

The following regular expression can be used for the purpose of validation:

^[A-Z]{1,2}[0-9][A-Z0-9]? ?[0-9][A-Z]{2}$

The following regular expression can be used for the purpose of validation and includes postcode formats from Special Cases:

^(([A-Z]{1,2}[0-9][A-Z0-9]?|ASCN|STHL|TDCU|BBND|[BFS]IQQ|PCRN|TKCA) ?[0-9][A-Z]{2}|BFPO ?[0-9]{1,4}|(KY[0-9]|MSR|VG|AI)[ -]?[0-9]{4}|[A-Z]{2} ?[0-9]{2}|GE ?CX|GIR ?0A{2}|SAN ?TA1)$

Post towns
All or part of one or more postcode districts are grouped into post towns. Larger post towns may use more than one postcode district, for example Crawley uses RH10 and RH11. In a minority of cases, a single number can cover two post towns—for example, the WN8 district includes Wigan and Skelmersdale post towns.

Special cases

Crown dependencies
The Channel Islands and the Isle of Man established their own postal administrations separate from the UK in 1969. Despite this, they adopted the UK-format postcodes in 1993–94: Guernsey using GY, the Isle of Man using IM, and Jersey using JE.

The independent jurisdiction of Sark was assigned a unique postcode prefix GY10 in 2011 to differentiate it from Alderney. The CEO of Guernsey Post, Boley Smillie, said "this has been a long time coming" and "... Sark should have had its own identity back then [when postcodes were adopted in 1993]".

British Overseas Territories

Some of the British Overseas Territories have postcodes that follow the format of the UK postcode system:

These were introduced because mail was often sent to the wrong place, e.g., for St Helena to St Helens, Isle of Wight. and Ascension Island to Asunción, Paraguay, and many online companies would not accept addresses without a postcode. Mail from the UK continues to be treated as international, not inland, and sufficient postage must be used. 

Bermuda, the UK's most populous remaining overseas territory, has developed its own postcode system, with unique postcodes for street and PO Box addresses, as have the Cayman Islands, Montserrat and the British Virgin Islands. Montserrat recently introduced postal codes, and a system has been under consideration in Gibraltar with the code GX11 1AA being introduced as the generic postcode for the territory in the interim.  

The British Sovereign Base Areas of Akrotiri and Dhekelia in Cyprus use Cypriot postal codes for civilian use. The British military use BFPO addresses.

The separate postal code systems for those territories are shown below:

British Forces Post Office (BFPO)

The British Forces Post Office (BFPO) provides a postal service to HM Forces separate from that provided by Royal Mail in the United Kingdom, with BFPO addresses used for the delivery of mail in the UK and around the world. BFPO codes such as "BFPO 801" serve the same function as postal codes for civilian addresses, with the last line of the address consisting of "BFPO" followed a space and a number of 1 to 4 digits.

For consistency with the format of other UK addresses, in 2012 BFPO and Royal Mail jointly introduced an optional alternative postcode format for BFPO addresses, using the new non-geographic postcode area "BF" and the notional post town "BFPO". Each BFPO number is assigned to a postcode in the standard UK format, beginning "BF1". The database was released commercially in March 2012 as part of the Royal Mail Postal Address File (PAF). A postcode is not required if the traditional "BFPO nnnn" format is used.

Non-geographic codes
Most postcodes apply to a geographic area but some are used only for routing and cannot be used for navigation or estimating distances. They are often used for direct marketing and PO boxes. Non-geographic postcode area BX is used solely for non-geographic addresses, with codes independent of the location of the recipient. Some postcode sectors or districts are set aside solely for non-geographic postcodes, including EC50, BS98, BT58, BX1–BX9, IM99, M60, N1P, NE99, SA99, SW9, WV99, WV98 and JE4.  Also the first two numbers can be from the range 91 to 95 for businesses and a range 96 to 99 for Government departments.  The letters HQ for the last two letters could also it most likely is a non-graphical postcode of that Royal Mail holds the mail which a redirection, bulk mail delivery or open and scan to email service is available. 
Girobank's headquarters in Bootle used the non-geographic postcode GIR 0AA. There is also a special postcode for letters to Santa/Father Christmas, XM4 5HQ.

Many non-geographic postcodes do not appear on Royal Mail's own online postcode finder tool or their Click and Drop online postage printing tool, which can add to confusion when responding to organisations that use such addresses. Likewise, delivery services or couriers other than Royal Mail may not be able to deliver to such non-physical addresses.

Special postcodes
Postcodes are allocated by Royal Mail's Address Management Unit and cannot be purchased or specified by the recipient. However, Royal Mail sometimes assigns semi-mnemonic postcodes to high-profile organisations.

Prominent examples are:

The postcode printed on Business Reply envelopes (which do not require a stamp) often ends with the letters BR.

Operation

Sorting
Postcodes are used to sort letters to their destination either manually, where sorters use labelled frames, or increasingly with letter-coding systems, where machines assist in sorting. A variation of automated sorting uses optical character recognition (OCR) to read printed postcodes, best suited to mail that uses a standard layout and addressing format.

A long string of "faced" letters (i.e. turned to allow the address to be read) is presented to a keyboard operator at a coding desk, who types the postcodes onto the envelopes in coloured phosphor dots. The associated machine uses the outward codes in these dots to direct bundles of letters into the correct bags for specific delivery offices. With a machine knowledge of the specific addresses handled by each postal walk at each office, the bundles can be further sorted using the dots of the inward sorting code so that each delivery round receives only its own letters. This feature depends upon whether it is cost effective to second-sort outward letters, and tends to be used only at main sorting offices where high volumes are handled.

When postcodes are incomplete or missing, the operator reads the post town name and inserts a code sufficient for outward sorting to the post town, where others can further direct it. The mail bags of letter bundles are sent by road, air or train, and eventually by road to the delivery office. At the delivery office the mail that is handled manually is inward sorted to the postal walk that will deliver it; it is then "set in", i.e. sorted into the walk order that allows the deliverer the most convenient progress in the round. The latter process is now being automated, as the roll-out of walk sequencing machines continues.

Integrated Mail Processors
Integrated Mail Processors (IMPs) read the postcode on the item and translate it into two phosphorus barcodes representing the inward and outward parts of the postcode, which the machines subsequently print and read to sort the mail to the correct outward postcode. Letters may also be sequentially sorted by a Compact Sequence Sorter (CSS) reading the outward postcode in the order that a walking postman/woman will deliver, door to door. On such items the top phosphorous barcode is the inward part of the code, the bottom is the outward.

IMPs can also read RM4SCC items, as used in Cleanmail, a different format to the above.

Mailsort and Walksort
A newer system of five-digit codes called Mailsort was designed for users who send "a minimum of 4,000 letter-sized items". It encodes the outward part of the postcode in a way that is useful for mail routing, so that a particular range of Mailsort codes goes on a particular plane or lorry. Mailsort users are supplied with a database to allow them to convert from postcodes to Mailsort codes and receive a discount if they deliver mail to the post office split up by Mailsort code. Users providing outgoing mail sorted by postcode receive no such incentive since postcode areas and districts are assigned using permanent mnemonics and do not therefore assist with grouping items together into operationally significant blocks. Walksort was discontinued in May 2012.

Listings and availability

There are approximately 1.7 million postcodes in the United Kingdom, the Channel Islands and the Isle of Man.

Each postcode is divided by a space into two parts. As mentioned above, the first part starts with the postcode area and ends with the postcode district. The second part begins with a single digit, which indicates the postcode sector, and ends with the postcode unit.

Postcode areas are also divided into several post towns, which predate the introduction of postcodes, with the London post town uniquely covering more than one postcode area.

As of June 2016, there are 124 postcode areas, 2,987 postcode districts, 11,192 postcode sectors, and 1,500 post towns. , 55,540 full postcodes in England and Wales contain only one household. Addresses receiving large volumes of mail are each assigned separate "large user" postcodes. But most postcodes are shared by several neighbouring properties, typically covering about 15 addresses.

Life-cycle of postcodes
There are also significant numbers of discontinued (terminated) codes. Each month some 2,750 postcodes are created and 2,500 terminated.

Postcode Address File (PAF)
The Address Management Unit of Royal Mail maintains an official database of UK postal addresses and postcodes in its Postcode Address File (PAF), which is made available under licence for a fee regulated by Ofcom. The PAF is commercially licensable and is often incorporated in address management software packages. The capabilities of such packages allow most addresses to be constructed solely from the postcode and house number. By including the map references of postcodes in the address database, the postcode can be used to pinpoint a postcode area on a map. PAF is updated daily.

On its website, Royal Mail publishes summary information about major changes to postcode sectors and postal localities (including post towns). Individual postcodes or postal addresses can be found using Royal Mail's Postcode and Address Finder website, but this is limited to 50 free searches per user per day.

Code-Point Open
A complete list of all current Great Britain postcodes, known as Code-Point Open, has been made available online (since 1 April 2010) by Ordnance Survey. Under the government's OS OpenData initiative, it is available for re-use without charge under an attribution-only licence. The Code-Point Open list includes median coordinates for each postcode but excludes postcodes in Northern Ireland and the Crown dependencies. Unlike the PAF products provided by Royal Mail, the Code-Point Open list does not include postal address text.

ONS Postcode Directory and National Statistics Postcode Lookup
The Office for National Statistics also produces postcode directories, under similar licence terms to the OS product. Both the ONSPD and NSPL contain Northern Ireland postcodes, with centroid coordinates in the OSI grid as opposed to the OSGB grid, although Northern Ireland postcodes are subject to a more restrictive licence permitting internal business use only. Postcodes for the Crown Dependences are also included, without co-ordinates. A further difference is that non-current postcodes and dates of introduction and withdrawal of postcodes are included.

Other uses

While postcodes were introduced to expedite the delivery of mail, they are useful tools for other purposes, particularly because codes are very fine-grained and identify just a few addresses. Among these uses are:
 With satellite navigation systems, to navigate to an address by street number and postcode
 By life insurance companies and pension funds to assess longevity for pricing and reserving
 By other types of insurance companies to assess premiums for motoring/business/domestic policies
 To determine catchment areas for school places or doctors' surgeries
Finding the nearest branch of an organisation to a given address. A computer program uses the postcodes of the target address and the branches to list the closest branches in order of distance as the crow flies (or, if used in conjunction with street-map software, by road distance). This can be used by companies to inform potential customers where to go, by job centres to find jobs for job-seekers, to alert people of town planning applications in their area, and a great many other applications.

The phrase "postcode lottery" refers to the variation in the availability of services by region, though not always because of postcodes.

For these and related reasons, postcodes in some areas have become indicators of social status. Some residents have campaigned to change their postcode to associate themselves with a more desirable area, to disassociate with a poorer area, to reduce insurance premiums or to be associated with an area with a lower cost of living. In all these cases Royal Mail has said that there is "virtually no hope" of changing the postcode, referring to their policy of changing postcodes only to match changes in their operations.

Postcode areas rarely align with local government boundaries and a few straddle England's borders with Wales and Scotland. This has led to British Sky Broadcasting subscribers receiving the wrong BBC and ITV regions, and newly licensed radio amateurs being given incorrect call signs.

See also
List of postcode areas in the United Kingdom
List of postal codes (around the world)
ACORN
Address Point
Postcode lottery
RM4SCC—a machine-readable barcode version of the postcode and delivery point suffix
Postcode Address File

References

 
United Kingdom
1959 introductions
United Kingdom
Postal history of the United Kingdom
United Kingdom